Rydaholms GoIF is a Swedish football club located in Rydaholm in Värnamo Municipality, Jönköping County.

Background
Since their foundation Rydaholms GoIF has participated mainly in the middle and lower divisions of the Swedish football league system.  The club currently plays in Division 3 Sydöstra Götaland which is the fifth tier of Swedish football. They play their home matches at the Kungshall in Rydaholm.

Rydaholms GoIF are affiliated to Smålands Fotbollförbund.

Recent history
In recent seasons Rydaholms GoIF have competed in the following divisions:

2011 – Division III, Sydöstra Götaland
2010 – Division III, Sydöstra Götaland
2009 – Division III, Sydöstra Götaland
2008 – Division III, Sydöstra Götaland
2007 – Division III, Sydöstra Götaland
2006 – Division II, Mellersta Götaland
2005 – Division III, Sydöstra Götaland
2004 – Division IV, Småland Västra Elit
2003 – Division IV, Småland Sydvästra
2002 – Division V, Småland Västra
2001 – Division V, Småland Västra
2000 – Division VI, Finnveden
1999 – Division VI, Alvesta

Attendances

In recent seasons Rydaholms GoIF have had the following average attendances:

Footnotes

External links
 Rydaholms GoIF – Official website
 Rydaholms GoIF on Facebook

Football clubs in Jönköping County
Association football clubs established in 1930
1930 establishments in Sweden